Mahmandar Mosque is one of the oldest mosques in Aleppo, Syria. It is located in the Ancient part of the city, north to the Citadel of Aleppo.

History
The mosque was built in 1303 by al-Hasan bin Balaban (also known as the son of the mahmandar), one of the high-ranked officers in the city of Aleppo. The word mahmandar itself is derived from the Persian words of mahman meaning the guset and dar meaning the officer. It was built in Mamluk and later in Mongol style. The mosque was severely damaged during the 1822 earthquake.

The mosque was entirely reconstructed in 1946.

References

Mamluk mosques in Syria
Mosques in Aleppo
14th-century mosques
Mosques completed in 1303
Mosques completed in 1946